The Butler Bulldogs women's softball team represents Butler University in Indianapolis, United States. The school's team currently competes in the Big East Conference. The 2014–2015 team opened the season on February 6, 2015, and concluded their regular season on April 21. The season consisted of 46 games and 5 tournaments.  The team won 22 of its first 45 games and lost 23.

Results

Roster

Seasons

References 

Butler Bulldogs
Butler Bulldogs softball seasons
Butler Bulldogs softball